Manikdev Banduji Ingale (30 April 1909 – 15 October 1968), or Tukdoji Maharaj,  was a spiritual saint from Maharashtra, India. He was born in 1909 in a poor family in the village of Yawali in Amravati. He was a disciple of Aadkoji Maharaj. Tukdoji Maharaj was involved in social reforms in the rural regions of Maharashtra, including construction of roads. He wrote Gramgeeta which describes means for village development. Many of the development programs started by him have continued to work efficiently after his death. He was once even claimed as a mad by one of the British officers.

Tukdoji Maharaj once attended a World Religions and World Peace Conference in Japan.

Biography

Saint Tukdoji Maharaj was born in Yawali, Maharashtra. He received spiritual initiation from Samarth Adkoji Maharaj of Warkhed gram. Early in childhood, Saint Tukdoji Maharaj performed rigorous penance and spiritual exercises in self-realisation. He also was a great orator and a musician who composed more than 3000 bhajans (spiritual poems) in Hindi and Marathi, having performed for the spiritual teacher Meher Baba in 1937 and 1944. He has also written many articles on Dharma, society, nation and education.

He studied the existing religious sects and other schools of thought and discussed religious and secular problems of the devotees. He was determined to re-define socio-Spirituality and revitalise and awaken the nation.

Work 
In 1941, Tukdoji Maharaj performed individual acts of civil resistance, famously called satyagraha, and took part in the mass upsurge of the 'Quit India' movement. He was arrested in 1942 and was imprisoned in Nagpur and Raipur Central Jails. When India had become independent, he concentrated on rural reconstruction, establishing the 'All India Shri Gurudev Seva Mandal' and developing programmes for integrated rural development. Rajendra Prasad, who was the first President of India, bestowed the title of 'Rashtrasant' on him.

He took part in Acharya Vinoba Bhave's land reform movement, known as the Bhoodan Movement, and he worked with relief aid at the time of the Bengal famine in 1945, at the time of the Sino-Indian War in 1962, and the Koyna earthquake in 1967.

He attended the World Conference of Religion and World Peace in Japan in 1955. 

He was one of the founding Vice Presidents of Vishwa Hindu Parishad.

He died on 11 October 1968.

Honors 
In 2005, the Nagpur University was renamed to Rashtrasant Tukadoji Maharaj Nagpur University. The postal department of India issued a commemorative stamp in his name in 1993.

Books written 

 Gramgeeta (in Marathi; later translated by others in English, Hindi, Urdu, Gujrati, and Sanskrit.)
 Sartha Anandamrut
 Sartha Atmaprabhav
 Geeta Prasad
 Bodhamrut
 Laharki Barkha Part 1, 2 & 3
 Anubhav Prakash Part 1, 2 and 3
 Meri Japan Yatra.

Popular culture 
 A short documentary depicting Maharaj was written and produced by Manoj Bhishnurkar.
Jeevanyogi, his biography, was written and published by his follower Sudam Sawarkar in the year 1990.

See also
Rashtrasant Tukadoji Maharaj Nagpur University

References

External links

 Official website of Tukdoji Maharaj
 Official website of Rashtrasant Tukdoji Maharaj by Shri Sunilbhau Gainkar,Gurudev Seva Mandal, Wardha

20th-century Hindu religious leaders
1909 births
1968 deaths
Indian independence activists from Maharashtra
People from Amravati district